The Soko Islands are a group of islands in Hong Kong. The group consists of Tai A Chau, Siu A Chau and several smaller nearby islands, in the southwesternmost waters of the territory, to the southwest of Lantau Island.

An older name for this island group was "Sok Kwu Kwan To" (Fishing Net Islands).

The islands are mainly composed of granite and a band of rhyodacite. Waters of the island group are brackish due to being in the Pearl River estuary.

Islands
The islands of the group are:

 Cheung Muk Tau
 Ko Pai
 Lung Shuen Pai
 Ma Chau
 Shek Chau
 Siu A Chau
 Tai A Chau
 Tau Lo Chau
 Wan Hau Chau
 Yuen Chau
 Yuen Kong Chau

History
Now uninhabited, the islands formerly accommodated a refugee camp for Vietnamese boat people. Vietnamese detention centres were established in Hong Kong following waves of Vietnamese fleeing after the fall of Saigon in 1975. The Tai A Chau Detention Centre (IN59) was closed in September 1996.

In 2016, CLP Power proposed the islands as site for a terminal to receive liquefied natural gas (LNG) for use in electricity generation. This proposal is opposed by local environmental groups because the surrounding waters are an important habitat for various marine species, particularly the rare Chinese white dolphin.

In February 2020, OceansAsia reported finding 70 face masks washed up on one beach of the islands. The same beach was examined the following November, and OceansAsia volunteers reported collecting 54 more masks.

Conservation
The soft shore beach of Siu A Chau can attract green turtles and the islands were proposed to be a protected marine park.

The South Lantau Marine Park was designated as a marine park in June 2022. It encompasses the Soko Islands and an area between Siu A Chau and Tai A Chau. The stated aim of the marine park is to help conserve the Chinese white dolphins and finless Porpoises.

Education
The Soko Islands are in Primary One Admission (POA) School Net 97. Within the school net are three aided schools (operated independently but funded with government money) on Cheung Chau; no government schools are in this net.

References

External links 
 

Islands District
Marine parks of Hong Kong
Islands of Hong Kong
Uninhabited islands of Hong Kong